Ceratozamia alvarezii is a species of plant in the family Zamiaceae. It is endemic to Mexico, where it is known only from Chiapas. It is found near Rizo de Oro in the Sierra Madre de Chiapas.

There are only two known subpopulations of this species, one of which comprises about 300 individuals. The species is threatened by habitat loss as land is cleared for agriculture.

References

Further reading
Perez-Farrera, M. A., Vovides, A. P., & Iglesias, C. (1999). A new species of Ceratozamia (Zamiaceae, Cycadales) from Chiapas, Mexico. Novon 9 410–413.

alvarezii
Endemic flora of Mexico
Flora of Chiapas
Plants described in 1999
Endangered plants
Endangered biota of Mexico
Taxonomy articles created by Polbot